Lakhon (sometimes spelled "Lakhaon" or "Lakorn") may refer to:
 Theatre of Cambodia (ល្ខោន)
 Lakhon Khol, a masked dance theatre
 Lakhon pol srey (ល្ខោនពោលស្រី), a dance drama genre that originated in the court of Oudong in Cambodia.
 Lakhon Yiké (ល្ខោនយីកេ), a dance drama genre originating in central Cambodia.
 Lakhon Bassac (ល្ខោនបាសាក់) the dance drama genre with poetry originating in the Mekong Delta region. 
 Lakhon Mohory (ល្ខោនមហោរី)

Culture of Thailand
Thai television soap opera (ละครโทรทัศน์)
Lakhon nai (ละครใน), a performing art that originated in the royal court of Siam
Lakhon nok (ละครนอก), a genre of theatre from the Ayutthaya era
Lakhon Chatri, a genre of dance and drama from Central Thailand

Cinema of India
Lakhon Mein Ek, a 1971 Bollywood comedy film
Lakhon Ki Baat, a 1984 Indian Bollywood film
Lakhon Mein Ek (TV series), an Indian television series